Frank J. may refer to:

 Frankie J (born 1975), Mexican-American singer
 Frank J. Fleming (commonly known as "Frank J."), American columnist and satirist